The Australian Open of Surfing is an annual surf, skate and music event held on Manly Beach, Sydney, Australia. It is World Surf League sanctioned surf contests for men and women surf athletes from around the world. It is owned by IMG
The inaugural nine-day event was held from the 11 to 19 February 2012. The Open was cancelled in 2018.

Pro Final Winners

Australian Longboard Surfing Open
The event began as the ‘Malfunction' Surf Festival in 1984. In 2012, the Longboard Surfing Open replaced the ‘Malfunction’ competition and went on to become the largest World Surf League sanctioned longboard competition in Australia. The open is held every March at Kingscliff, Tweed Heads, New South Wales.
 
The event was not run in 2019 and 2020.

Pro Final Winners

References

External links
  of Australian Open of Surfing
 of Australian Longboard Surfing Open

Surfing competitions in Australia
Sports competitions in Sydney
Recurring events established in 2012
Festivals in Sydney
Recurring sporting events established in 2012
Manly, New South Wales